Pattern Recognition is a single blind   peer reviewed  academic journal published by Elsevier Science. It was first published in 1968 by Pergamon Press. The founding editor-in-chief was Robert Ledley, who was succeeded from 2009  until 2016  by Ching Suen of Concordia University. Since  2016 the current editor-in-chief is Edwin Hancock of the University of York. The journal publishes papers in the general area of pattern recognition, including applications in the areas of image processing, computer vision, handwriting recognition, biometrics and biomedical signal processing. The journal awards the Pattern Recognition Society Medal to the best paper published in the  journal each year.
In 2020, the journal had an impact factor of 7.196 and  it currently has a Scopus CiteScore of 13.1. Google Scholar currently lists the journal  as ranked 6th  in the top 20  publications in Computer Vision and Pattern Recognition.

Abstracting and indexing
The journal is abstracted and indexed by the following services:

References

External links 
 

Artificial intelligence publications
Publications established in 1968
Computer science journals
Monthly journals
English-language journals